Komba is a village in the Bas-Uélé province of the Democratic Republic of the Congo. It was a junction on the defunct Vicicongo line, a railway.

Location

Komba is in the Aketi Territory of Bas-Uélé province, Democratic Republic of the Congo.
It is on the RN6 road between Aketi to the west and Dulia to the east.
From there the RN4 runs north to Likati.

Former railway

The  section of the Vicicongo line from Aketi, built by the Société des Chemins de Fer Vicinaux du Congo, reached Komba in July 1926.
The  section from Komba to Likati was opened on 1 January 1927.
The  section from Komba to Buta was opened on 1 July 1931.

Notes

Sources

Populated places in Bas-Uélé